Mohamed Lamine Alhousseini Alhassan (born July 22, 1978) is a Nigerien swimmer. He competed at the 2008 Summer Olympics in the Men’s 50m Freestyle event. He placed number 4 in the second heat of the first round with a time of 30.90 seconds and placed 95 overall.

References

External links
Mohamed Alhousseini
Men's 50 m freestyle, results 2008 Beijing Olympics

Living people
Nigerien male swimmers
Olympic swimmers of Niger
Swimmers at the 2008 Summer Olympics
1978 births
21st-century Nigerien people